Strangers Kiss is a 1983 American drama film directed by Matthew Chapman, and starring Peter Coyote, Victoria Tennant, Dan Shor and Blaine Novak.  The screenplay by Chapman and Novak documents the behind-the-scenes of Stanley Kubrick's second directorial feature, Killer's Kiss (1955).

The film premiered at the Montreal World Film Festival on August 24, 1983 and the Toronto International Film Festival on September 17 before being theatrically distributed in select markets by Orion Classics on February 1, 1984.

Plot
To help his actress girlfriend regain her confidence, a Hollywood bigshot bankrolls a small film being made by a first-time producer and director duo. Despite the hand-to-mouth way it is made, the film turns out well, as does the off-set relationship between the actress and her unknown male lead.

Cast
 Peter Coyote as Stanley, the director
 Victoria Tennant as Carol Redding / Betty
 Dan Shor as Farris, the producer
 Blaine Novak as Stevie Blake
 Richard Romanus as Frank Silvera
 Linda Kerridge as Shirley
 Carlos Palomino as Esteban
 Vincent Palmieri as Scandelli
 Jay Rasummy as Jimmy
 Jon Sloan as Mickey
 Joseph Nipote as Tony the Nose

Sources 
http://www.imdb.com/title/tt0088185/
http://rogerebert.suntimes.com/apps/pbcs.dll/article?AID=/19840101/REVIEWS/401010392/1023
http://movies.nytimes.com/movie/review?res=9807E5D9143AF930A2575BC0A962948260

1983 films
1983 drama films
Films about filmmaking
Films directed by Matthew Chapman
American drama films
Works about Stanley Kubrick
1980s English-language films
1980s American films